Lozi, also known as siLozi and Rozi, is a Bantu language of the Niger–Congo language family within the Sotho–Tswana branch of Zone S (S.30), that is spoken by the Lozi people, primarily in southwestern Zambia and in surrounding countries. This language is most closely related to Northern Sotho (Sesotho sa Leboa), Tswana (Setswana), Kgalagari (SheKgalagari) and Sotho (Sesotho/Southern Sotho). Lozi, sometimes written as Rotse, and its dialects are spoken and understood by approximately six percent of the population of Zambia. Silozi is the endonym (the name of the language used by its native speakers) as defined by the United Nations. Lozi is the exonym.

The Lozi language developed from a mixture of two languages: Luyana and Kololo. The Luyana people originally migrated south from the Kingdom of Luba and Kingdom of Lunda in the Katanga area of the Congo River basin, either  late in the 17th century or early in the 18th century. The language they spoke, therefore, was closely related to Luba and Lunda. They settled on the floodplains of the upper Zambezi in what is now western Zambia and developed a kingdom, Barotseland, and also gave their name to the Barotse Floodplain or Bulozi.

The Kololo were a Sotho people who used to live in what is now the Free State province of South Africa. The Kololo were forced to flee from Shaka Zulu's Mfecane during the 1830s. Using tactics they had copied from the Zulu armies, the Kololo conquered the Luyana on the Zambezi floodplains and imposed their rule and language. However, by 1864 the indigenous population revolted and overthrew the Kololo. By that time, the Luyana language had been largely forgotten; the new hybrid language is called Lozi or Silozi and is closer to Sesotho than to any other neighbouring languages in Zambia.

Lozi is also spoken in Zimbabwe, Botswana, and Namibia (Zambezi Region).

Phonology
Lozi has 5 vowels:

20 consonants are in Lozi:

Tone is marked as high or low.

Orthography 

Lozi uses the Latin script, which was introduced by missionaries. In 1977, Zambia standardised the language's orthography.

Vocabulary

Sample text 

The following is a sample text in Lozi of Article 1 of the Universal Declaration of Human Rights (by the United Nations):

References

External links

Lozi alphabet and pronunciation at Omniglot
A sample paragraph in Lozi
Silozi-English Dictionary, glossaries, beginner's guide, other info
 Lozi English Dictionary from Webster's Online Dictionary - The Rosetta Edition
PanAfrican L10n page on Lozi
OLAC resources in and about the Lozi language
Medical phrases in Lozi

Lozi language stories 
Sibetta, O.Kwibisa, Ze Patezwi ba Banca, Lubuto Library Special Collections, accessed May 3, 2014
Silozi language stories, Lubuto Library Special Collections, accessed May 3, 2014

 
Sotho-Tswana languages
Languages of Botswana
Languages of Namibia
Languages of South Africa
Languages of Zambia
Languages of Zimbabwe
Library of Congress Africa Collection related
Lozi people